Kate Blackwell KC (born 5 October 1969) is a British barrister. A member of Lincoln House Chambers in Manchester, she became a Crown Court Recorder in 2009 and Queen's Counsel in 2012. Blackwell has been described by The Guardian as a ‘no-nonsense prosecutor’.

Career
Called to the bar in 1992, Blackwell was a junior counsel in the team conducting the prosecution of the British serial killer Harold Shipman. She was later appointed to The Shipman Inquiry chaired by Dame Janet Smith in 2000.

Blackwell was appointed as counsel to the Daniel Morgan Independent Panel commissioned by the Home Office in 2014 and chaired by Baroness O'Loan, to address questions relating to police involvement in the unsolved murder of Daniel Morgan, the role played by police corruption and the incidence of corrupt connections between private investigators, the London Metropolitan Police and journalists at the News of the World.

Blackwell was "vilified" by the media in 2013 when a complainant in a rape case committed suicide a week after cross-examination by her in court. The trial judge described Blackwell's behaviour as "perfectly proper and correct in her examination of all the witnesses in this case".

Blackwell was appointed as the expert legal adviser to the Gosport Independent Panel in 2015 to investigate historic concerns about the initial care of older people at Gosport War Memorial Hospital and the subsequent investigations into their deaths. The Panel found that, during the relevant period, the lives of over 450 patients were shortened by clinically inappropriate use of opioid analgesics, with an additional 200 lives also likely to have been shortened if missing medical records are taken into account.

In 2016, Blackwell was lead barrister for the successful prosecution of former Sunderland footballer Adam Johnson at Bradford Crown Court. On 28 February 2017, Blackwell appeared at the Court of Appeal to respond on behalf of the Crown to an application by Johnson for permission to appeal his conviction and sentence. After hearing argument from both sides, the Court, presided over by Lady Justice Rafferty, reserved judgement. On 16 March 2017, the Court of Appeal refused leave for Johnson to appeal his conviction and sentence.

Blackwell was appointed as the Deputy Head of Lincoln House Chambers, in March 2016.

At the Manchester Legal Awards 2017 ceremony, Blackwell won the 'Barrister of the Year' award.

In December 2017 Blackwell was appointed as a Master of the Bench at  Lincoln's Inn. She was presented by Lord Justice McCombe and published by the Treasurer, Lord Neuberger.

Blackwell was awarded 'Barrister of the Year' for the second time at the 10th Anniversary Manchester Legal Awards on 7 March 2019.

Early years
After attending Loreto Grammar School in Altrincham, Greater Manchester (1981–88), Blackwell studied Law at the University of Birmingham (1989–92) and subsequently went to the Inns of Court School of Law in London where she completed the Bar Vocational Course. A keen member of the National Youth Theatre, she performed in Murder in the Cathedral by T. S. Eliot at The Edinburgh Festival in 1982.

References

1969 births
Living people
Lawyers from Manchester
Alumni of the University of Birmingham
English barristers
21st-century King's Counsel
Alumni of the Inns of Court School of Law
Members of Lincoln's Inn